Herman John Severson (November 19, 1869September 2, 1950) was an American attorney, judge, and Progressive Republican politician.  He was a Wisconsin circuit court judge for the last 12 years of his life after serving 20 years in the Wisconsin State Senate.

Biography

Born in the Town of Christiana, Dane County, Wisconsin, Severson grew up on his father's farm and then  went to Stoughton Normal Institute, Red Wing College, Drake University and then received his law degree from University of Wisconsin Law School. He also taught school and was principal of a school in London, Wisconsin. Severson practiced law in Iola, Wisconsin, and was district attorney of Waupaca County, Wisconsin from 1908 to 1916 and was a Republican. Severson was president of the Iola State Bank and the Herald Publishing Company. Then from 1918 to 1938, Severson served in the Wisconsin State Senate and was involved with the Wisconsin Progressive Party. In 1938, Severson was elected a Wisconsin Circuit Court judge and served until 1950, when he died in office. Severson died in Iola, Wisconsin.

References

External links
 

1869 births
1950 deaths
People from Christiana, Dane County, Wisconsin
People from Iola, Wisconsin
Drake University alumni
University of Wisconsin Law School alumni
Businesspeople from Wisconsin
Educators from Wisconsin
Farmers from Wisconsin
Wisconsin lawyers
Wisconsin state court judges
Wisconsin Progressives (1924)
20th-century American politicians
Republican Party Wisconsin state senators